Donald Joseph Scardino (born February 17, 1949) is an American television director and producer and a former actor.

Career

Acting
Scardino was born in New York City, to jazz musician parents, Dorothy Denny Scardino and Charles Scardino. His first Broadway credit was as an understudy in The Playroom in 1965. Additional Broadway acting credits include Johnny No-Trump, Godspell, and King of Hearts. Off-Broadway he appeared in The Rimers of Eldritch, The Comedy of Errors, Moonchildren, and I'm Getting My Act Together and Taking It on the Road, he was also the lead in a B horror movie titled Squirm in 1976. He additionally starred in several episodes of the CBS Radio Mystery Theater, which ran from 1974 to 1982. In addition, he served as artistic director at Playwrights Horizons from 1991 to 1996. On television he appeared on the daytime soap operas The Guiding Light, All My Children, Love Is a Many Splendored Thing, and Another World and the primetime series The Ghost & Mrs. Muir and The Name of the Game. Feature film credits include The People Next Door (1970), Homer (1970), Rip-Off (1971), Squirm (1976), Cruising (1980) and He Knows You're Alone (1980). 

In 2020, Scardino appeared as a guest on The Big Alakens Big Lake marathon fundraiser episode of The George Lucas Talk Show.

Directing
Following his acting on the network soap operas, Scardino began to direct them.  He directed episodes of Another World, One Life to Live, and All My Children. He went on to direct plays on and off-Broadway, including the world premiere of Aaron Sorkin's A Few Good Men. He has directed extensively in television, most notably Tracey Takes On... and 30 Rock. Feature film directing work includes Me and Veronica (Venice Film Festival), and Advice from a Caterpillar, winner, best comedy, at Aspen Comedy Festival.
He directed the 2013 film The Incredible Burt Wonderstone, starring Jim Carrey and Steve Carell.

Awards and nominations
1986 Daytime Emmy Award for Outstanding Young Man in a Drama Series- Another World, Nominated
1994 Emmy Award for Outstanding Directing for a Variety or Music Program- Tracey Takes on New York, Nominated
1998 Emmy Award for Outstanding Directing for a Variety or Music Program- Tracey Takes On... , Nominated
1998 Directors Guild of America Award for Outstanding Directorial Achievement in Musical/Variety- Tracey Takes On... , Nominated
2008 Emmy Award for Outstanding Comedy Series- 30 Rock, Won
2009 Emmy Award for Outstanding Comedy Series- 30 Rock, Won
2010 Emmy Award for Outstanding Directing for a Comedy Series- 30 Rock, Nominated

Selected directing credits
 The Days and Nights of Molly Dodd (1988–1991)
 A Few Good Men (1989 Broadway play)
 Law & Order (1991–2006)
 Tracey Takes On... (1997–1998)
 Cosby (1998–2000)
 The West Wing (2000)
 Ed (2002–2003)
 Law & Order: Criminal Intent (2002–2003)
 Oldest Living Confederate Widow Tells All (2003 Broadway play)
 George Lopez (2004)
 Hope & Faith (2004–2006)
 Lennon (2005 Broadway musical)
 30 Rock (2006–2013)
Rescue Me (2007)
The Incredible Burt Wonderstone (2013)
2 Broke Girls (2013–2017)
Crazy Ex-Girlfriend (2015)
Young Sheldon (2017)
LA to Vegas (2018)
Instinct (2018)
All About the Washingtons (2018)
The Cool Kids (2018)
New Amsterdam (2019)
The Conners (2020)
Our Almost Completely True Story (2021)
Only Murders in the Building (2021)

Selected producing credits
 The Days and Nights of Molly Dodd (1988–1991)
 Deadline (2000–2001)
 30 Rock (2006–2010)

Selected acting credits
The People Next Door (1970) as Sandy Hoffman
Homer (1970) as Homer Edwards
Rip-Off (1971) as Michael
Squirm (1976) as Mick
Cruising (1980) as Ted Bailey
He Knows You're Alone (1980) as Marvin Travis

References

External links
 
 
 
 Don Scardino at Godspell.ca

1949 births
Living people
American male film actors
American male radio actors
American male soap opera actors
American male stage actors
American male television actors
American theatre directors
American television directors
Male actors from New York City